The Feeding of the 5000 is the first album by the anarcho-punk band Crass. The album was recorded on 29 October 1978, by John Loder at Southern Studios and was released the same year.  It was considered revolutionary in its time due to what was considered an extreme sound, frequently profane lyrical content and the anarchist political ideals in the lyrics. The album also saw the introduction of Crass's policy of ensuring cheap prices for their records. This album is considered one of the first punk albums to expound serious anarchist philosophies.

Album information
The record was made when Pete Stennett, owner of Small Wonder Records, heard a demo that the band had recorded. Impressed by all of the material, he decided that rather than release a conventional single by the band, he would put all of their set onto an 18-track 12" EP. However, problems were encountered when workers at the Irish pressing plant contracted to manufacture the record refused to handle it due to the allegedly blasphemous content of the track "Reality Asylum" (referred to as "Asylum" on the record sleeve). The record was eventually released with this track removed and replaced by two minutes of silence, retitled "The Sound of Free Speech". This incident also prompted Crass to set up their own record label in order to retain full editorial control over their material, and "Reality Asylum" was issued shortly afterwards in a re-recorded and extended form as a 7" single. A later repress of The Feeding of The 5000 (subtitled The Second Sitting) released on Crass records in 1980 restored the missing track.

Crass helped reinitiate the influence of the Campaign for Nuclear Disarmament and the wider peace campaign in the UK with the songs like "They've Got a Bomb", "Fight War Not Wars" and the adoption of the CND Symbol at their live concerts.

"They've got a Bomb" also has a period of silence within it, inspired by John Cage's "4'33"". The band have acknowledged the influence of Cage, and said that the idea of the space in the song, when performed live, was to suddenly stop the energy, dancing and noise and allow the audience to momentarily "confront themselves" and consider the reality of nuclear war.

"The feeding of the five thousand" is a well-known phrase in Christian tradition, being the name of a Biblical miracle in which a small amount of food is said to have fed 5,000 people. According to the band's drummer and spokesperson, Penny Rimbaud, "We named the album The Feeding of The Five Thousand because 5,000 was the minimum number that we could get pressed and some 4900 more than we thought we'd sell. Feeding is now only a few hundred short of going golden, though I don't suppose we'll hear too much about that in the music press".

On 16 August 2010, The Feeding of the 5000 was rereleased as the first volume of The Crassical Collection. As well as being digitally remastered from the original analogue studio tapes, the release also contains additional artwork by Gee Vaucher, bonus material and a 64-page booklet of lyrics and liner notes by Rimbaud and Steve Ignorant.

In December 2019, the band, in co-operation with One Little Indian Records, released the entire unedited 16-track master tape of the album for fans to remix, the selected results being included on a compilation album with the working title "Normal Never Was". It was announced that the proceeds from the album would go to the anti-domestic abuse charity Refuge.

On 2 October 2020, the Crassical Collection version was reissued, with the bonus tracks moved to a second CD.

Track listing

Personnel
Crass - producer
Steve Ignorant - vocals
Joy De Vivre - voice on track 11.
Eve Libertine - voice on track 1.
Phil Free - lead guitar, backing vocals
N.A.Palmer - rhythm guitar, backing vocals
Pete Wright - bass guitar, backing vocals, lead vocals on tracks 12, 13, 14.
Penny Rimbaud - drums, radio
John Loder - engineer
G (Gee Vaucher) - artwork

References

Further reading
 

1978 debut albums
Crass Records albums
Crass albums